Oakland City is a neighborhood in southwestern Atlanta, Georgia, just southwest across the BeltLine from West End and Adair Park.

Oakland City was incorporated as a city in 1894 and annexed to Atlanta in 1910.

Oakland City Historic District is listed on the National Register of Historic Places. It contains wood and brick bungalows as well as Minimal Traditional, English Vernacular Revival, and Craftsman houses. The district included the Withers House, which was demolished in the first decade of the 2000s.

The neighborhood is served by the Oakland City station.

External links
 Oakland City Community Organization (OCCO)
Oakland City Historic District Regulations, retrieved 2011-01-15
 History of Oakland City, "A Revitalization Plan for Atlanta’s Oakland City Neighborhood", Southwest Atlanta Neighborhood Collaborative and West Atlanta Watershed Alliance, 2012

References

Historic districts on the National Register of Historic Places in Georgia (U.S. state)
Neighborhoods in Atlanta
Bungalow architecture in Georgia (U.S. state)
Former municipalities in Georgia (U.S. state)
National Register of Historic Places in Atlanta